Damarukam is a 2012 Indian Telugu-language action fantasy film written and directed by Srinivasa Reddy, and produced by R. R. Venkat on R. R. Movie Makers. It stars Nagarjuna, Anushka Shetty, Prakash Raj, and P. Ravishankar. The music is composed by Devi Sri Prasad with cinematography by Chota K. Naidu.

The film was released in 2012 and opened to positive reviews from critics who appreciated Nagarjuna's performance. Naidu won Filmfare Award for Best Cinematographer - South.

Plot
The protagonist of the movie is born with the divine grace of Lord Siva, and the boy's parents are advised to name him Mallikaarjuna as he is destined to accomplish a great work. During his childhood, Mallikaarjuna faces a great tragedy as his parents and grandparents are killed by a huge black panther as they return from Kaasi. This incident leaves his younger sister, Sailu, paralyzed from the waist and hence renders her lame (Sailu had a talent for dancing before this incident). Malli then develops strong hatred toward Lord Siva.

Meanwhile, the scene shifts to the focus of a demon named Andhakaasura. We see him performing a severe penance to obtain the boon of Lord Siva. Lord Siva blesses the demon that he will not interfere in the latter's attempt to sacrifice a virgin girl to obtain complete rulership over the three worlds. The demon is advised by his aged friend Maayi that the sacrifice must be made a month having two solar eclipses, in such a way that he has to marry the girl and sacrifice her before the solar eclipse ends. This will render the demon matchless and a master over all the five elements.

The story then shifts to Malli, now an adult whose motive is to help people and take care of his bedridden sister. He falls in love with Dr. Maheswari on a visit to the hospital where his sister is being treated. There are many scenes where the atheist Malli forces the people of his colony, who include Rudraksha, Ringu Raja, the President, and others, not to worship, on account of his childhood tragedy. Then, one day, Sailu was just about to die, when Malli goes, Sailu tells him that she wants to die because of her unbearable pain. On this occasion, Malli questions Lord Siva about his condition and drives away in his car, only to meet with an accident. But Lord Siva intervenes and saves him. Lord Siva calls himself Saambayya, befriends Malli, and goes to his home.

The demon chooses Dr. Maheswari as his target for the sacrifice and prevents the aghoraas (who arrive at the temple) from having access to Mahi, on the first solar eclipse day. Malli rescues Mahi from the Aghoraas, and Mahi's parents entrust Malli to take care of Mahi. Then, Mahi's parents decide to have Mahi marry a relative, Raahul, who is to arrive from the US. This advice is given by a saint known to Mahi's family. On his arrival at the airport, Andhakaasura kills Raahul in the washroom, kills him, and possesses his dead body. Andhakaasura, now in Raahul's form, enters Mahi's home and kills the three dogs who guard Mahi. The demon also paralyzes Mahi's father, when he learns the truth about him. He also tries to kill Malli and Mahi, on their way to a temple, but Lord Siva intervenes by sending his divine vehicle, Nandi, who saves Malli. This infuriates the demon, who feels that Lord Siva has not kept his promise. He challenges the Lord, to which he replies that it was his duty to protect his devotee. The demon then decides to oppose Lord Siva, so he kills the saint known to Mahi's family, impersonates him, and convinces Malli, Mahi and others that Saambayya is not a good person by faking his death at the hands to Saambayya. This makes Malli angry at Saambayya, and he returns the ring of friendship given to him by Saambayya.

Finally, Malli convinces Mahi's family that Rahul is Andhakaasura. Then, the demon carries Mahi to the spot of sacrifice and prepares for the ritual. Meanwhile, Malli is advised by the Aghora chief to worship Lord Siva, and he tells Malli about his purpose of birth to destroy the demon and the means to do it, as he was the reason for the tragedy in Malli's childhood and Lord Siva saved him as Saambayya. Malli confronts the demon and is initially defeated, but he heads skyward to get a blessing from Lord Siva and finally destroys Andhakaasura by piercing him with the Trident given by Lord Siva.

Cast

 Nagarjuna as Mallikarjuna / Malli
 Anushka Shetty as Maheswari / Mahi
 Prakash Raj as Lord Siva / Sambayya
 Ravi Sankar as Andhakaasura Rakshasa
 Ganesh Venkatraman as Rahul
 Brahmanandam as Rudraksha
 M. S. Narayana as Vankara Satyam
 Devan as Visvanadham
 Avinash as Kaapaalika's chief
 Brahmaji as Visvanadham's brother
 Priya as Mallikarjuna's mother
 Sameer as Mallikarjuna's father
 Geetanjali as Mallikarjuna's grandmother
 Giri Babu as Mallikarjuna's grandfather
 Raghu Babu as Goke Ring Raju
 Krishna Bhagavan as Colony President
 Thagubothu Ramesh as Full Bottle Vasu 
 Pragati as Rajeshwari
 Abhinaya as Sailaja / Sailu
 Jeeva as Maayi
 Pruthviraj as Ad Film Director
 Duvvasi Mohan
 Ajay
 Kavitha
 Satya Krishnan
 Rajitha
 Sravan
 Kamal 
 Prabhu 
 Ramaraju 
 Vijaya Rangaraju 
 Apoorva
 Kalpana
 Lakshmi
 Aruna 
 Amurtha Gowri 
 Sruthi 
 Archana 
 Anitha
 Nandini
 Nancy
 Master Gaurav as Young Malli
 Charmy as Sakkubai (item number)

Production

Casting
The film sees Nagarjuna and Anushka Shetty playing the leads. Prakash Raj, P. Ravi Shankar, Pradeep Rawat, Ganesh Venkatraman, Brahmanandam, Krishna Bhagavaan, Ahuti Prasad, Ali, Venu Madhav, Raghu Babu, M.S. Narayana and Jeeva are in the cast. Editing is by Gautham Raju, art is by Ashok, cinematography is by Chota K. Naidu and music is by Devi Sri Prasad., Times of Ap reported that Lakshmi Rai was set to shake legs with Nagarjuna for the introduction song in this movie. The makers then have decided to set Charmy in the place of Lakshmi Rai for the introduction song in this movie. Nagarjuna had shown his six-pack abs for the first time in the movie.

Filming
The shooting of the film began on 25 April 2011. The first schedule of the film was in Switzerland, where Nagarjuna would romance Anushka Shetty to the choreography of Raju Sundaram. On 29 September 2012, The theatrical trailer of this socio-fantasy film has released with the movie Rebel, which graced the theatres that day. According to the producer Dr Venkat, the trailer has received a huge response from the film goers. This movie is the first Telugu film ever with over 70 minutes of special effects. A team of visual effects experts at Firefly Creative Studio have been working on the movie for over a year now. Firefly, the company which worked on special effects for films like Anji, Arundathi, Magadheera and Anaganaga O Dheerudu. Vyshnavi Films purchased the overseas theatrical rights.

Release
After much delays the film was released on 23 November 2012

Critical reception
idlebrain.com jeevi gave a rating of 3/5 stating "First half of the film is good, Plus points of the film are Nagarjuna and the grandeur". Great andhra also rated 3/5 DNA India gave the film 2.5 and Times of India gave 3.5 ratings. Reddif also rated 3/5 and said "This socio-fantasy is one-of-its-kind in today's times and can be watched once for the stunning visuals".

Accolades

Soundtrack

Music was composed by Devi Sri Prasad. Music was released on Aditya Music.

The audio release was held on 10 September 2012 at Shilpakala Vedika in Hyderabad. Devi Sri Prasad scored the music and there are 10 songs for which lyricists Jonnavittula, Chandra Bose, Sahithi and Bhaskara Bhatla have penned the lyrics. entertainment.in.msn.com gave a moderate review stating "Devi Sri Prasad's 50th album is unique from his usual run-of-the-mill compositions, but not his best. As a fan of the composer, the listener will be satisfied, but as a music lover, one doubts if this album would live up to listeners' expectations." telugu.way2movies.com gave a positive review stating "Damarukam has the mix of devotional tracks on Lord Siva along with the romantic duets and a mass track. The devotion numbers are highly appealing and catch your attention while the duets are likeable with the repeated listen. Sakkubai will be instantly liked by masses. DSP scores well with his 50th album Damarukam." Musicperk.com rated the album 8.5/10 quoting "A must-listen album by DSP. Not a song to be left out".

References

External links
 

2012 films
2010s Telugu-language films
2010s fantasy action films
Indian fantasy action films